The Colorado Christian University Event Center is the home arena of the Colorado Christian Cougars, who play basketball in the Rocky Mountain Athletic Conference. 

In addition to university activities, the Event Center has served as the home arena for the American Basketball Association Colorado Storm in 2004 and the International Basketball League Colorado Crossover in 2006-2007.

References

Buildings and structures in Jefferson County, Colorado
Buildings and structures in Lakewood, Colorado
College basketball venues in the United States
Colorado Christian University
Indoor arenas in Colorado
Sports in Lakewood, Colorado
Sports venues in Colorado